Allanaspides hickmani, also known as Hickman's Pygmy Mountain Shrimp, is a species of mountain shrimp in the family Anaspididae.

The IUCN conservation status of Allanaspides hickmani is "VU", vulnerable. The species faces a high risk of endangerment in the medium term. The IUCN status was reviewed in 1996.

References

Malacostraca
Articles created by Qbugbot
Crustaceans described in 1971